Summit Lake in British Columbia may refer to:

 In Alberni Land District:
 Summit Lake 
 In Cariboo Land District:
 Summit Lake 
 Summit Lake (Crooked River)
 Summit Lake 
 In Cassiar Land District:
 Summit Lake 
 Summit Lake 
 Summit Lake 
 Summit Lake 
 In Kootenay Land District:
 Summit Lake 
 Summit Lake 
 Summit Lake 
 Summit Lake 
 In Lillooet Land District:
 Summit Lake 
 In Peace River Land District:
 Summit Lake 
 In Range 5 Coast Land District:
 Summit Lake 
 In Yale Land District
 Summit Lake (Similkameen Division) 
 Summit Lake (Yale Division) 
 Queen Charlotte Land District
 Summit Lakes

See also

 Summit Lake (disambiguation)
 Upper Summit Lake (British Columbia) (Cariboo Land District)

References
 Advanced Search on Atlas of Canada using search term "Summit Lake" and parameters "British Columbia" and "Water Feature" retrieved on 16 Feb 2010